Director Musices is computer software produced by the Department of Speech, Music and Hearing at KTH Royal Institute of Technology. It aims to give an expressive, human-like performance to a musical score by varying the volume and timing of the notes. Director Musices is written in CMU Common Lisp and distributed as free software. It processes MIDI files.

External links
 Software for Automatic Music Performance including Director Musices and pDM
 Director Musices with Lilypond "Howto" (instructions on how to set up Director Musices to process GNU LilyPond output)

See also
Sibelius (software) a commercial program that also includes automatically expressive playing
List of music software

References
 Computer Music Journal (2000)

Music software